Novak Djokovic defeated Rafael Nadal in the final, 4–6, 6–3, 7–6(7–4) to win the men's singles tennis title at the 2011 Miami Masters. With the win, Djokovic completed the Sunshine Double, having also won Indian Wells the week before (also defeating Nadal in the final). Djokovic's unbeaten streak to the start of the 2011 season was extended to 24–0, and an overall winning streak of 26 matches.

Andy Roddick was the defending champion, but lost to Pablo Cuevas in the second round.

Seeds
All seeds received a bye into the second round.

Qualifying

Draw

Finals

Top half

Section 1

Section 2

Section 3

Section 4

Bottom half

Section 5

Section 6

Section 7

Section 8

References

 Main Draw

2011 ATP World Tour
2011 Sony Ericsson Open
Men in Florida